The Karnataka Quiz Association (or KQA) was founded in 1983 by the late Wing Commander G.R.Mulky, Deepak Murdeshwar, Rajeev Gowda, Thomas Uthup, K.N.Mahabala, Thribhuvan Kumar, P.Raju and Jagadish Raja  is a non-profit association devoted to popularizing the mindsport among students and the general public in Bangalore and beyond. Contests are held regularly in the following categories: Middle School, High School, Junior College, College, and Open-to-all. In addition, specialist quizzes in the areas of Literature, Entertainment, Music, Art, Comics and Business are held every year.

The KQA holds events in English and Kannada.

Apart from holding contests, the KQA also conducts workshops in quizzing for school students and provides quiz-masters for events held by other organisations.

The KQA has an informal membership policy. People interested in quizzing sign up to receive a free email newsletter about forthcoming contests. The newsletter goes out to about 2000 people at present.

KQA quizzes normally used to take place once every month at the Daly Memorial Hall, a charming British-era building on Nrupatunga Road. Now, however the venue has shifted to Arakere Hall (also known as the IAT Hall) on Queen's Road.

KQA's flagship event, ASKQANCE, is held in the third week of June every year and comprises three quizzes, one each in the School, Corporate and Open Categories. The KQA also holds a solo quiz titled Mahaquizzer as well as a solo quiz event called MindSweep across India's several quizzing cities annually. Since 2003, the KQA has collaborated with the TI Foundation in conducting the Jack Kilby Quiz in Science and Technology for high school students.

ASKQANCE 
The quizzing season in Bangalore has always begun with an open quiz in June to mark the anniversary of the founding of the KQA. This tradition was reworked around the time of the 20th anniversary in 2003 to include a School Quiz, a Corporate Quiz and the customary Open Quiz. This festival of quizzing was christened ASKQANCE to celebrate the ethic of thinking laterally and working things out. ASKQANCE draws teams from other quizzing centres such as Chennai, Hyderabad, Cochin, New Delhi and Pune.

The Texas Instruments Science and Technology Quiz 
The TI Foundation has conducted a quiz in science and technology for school students since 2003 in collaboration with the KQA. The quiz was originally named after Nobel laureate Jack Kilby who designed the first Integrated Circuit while working for Texas Instruments but is now known by the name of the company. The first three editions of the quiz, hosted by Ochintya Sharma, were held in Bangalore, and attracted participation from more than 200 schools in the region. The quiz went national in 2006, with winners from Bangalore, Chennai and New Delhi facing off at a grand finale in Delhi. In the year 2008, the contest was extended to two more cities - Pune and Kolkata.

Texas Instruments Science & Technology Quiz winners 
2003: National Public School (Indiranagar)

2004: Delhi Public School, Bangalore

2005: Sri Kumaran Children's Home

2006: Bangalore Winners—National Public School (Indiranagar)
2006: Chennai Winners—SRDF Vivekananda Vidyalaya 
2006: New Delhi Winners—DPS RK Puram

2006: National Winners—National Public School (Indiranagar)

2007: New Delhi Winners—Bluebell 
2007: Chennai Winners—Vidya Mandir, Mylapore 
2007: Bangalore Winners—Sri Kumaran Children's Home

2007: National Winners—Vidya Mandir, Mylapore, Chennai

2008: Bangalore Winners—National Public School, Indiranagar 
2008: Delhi Winners—Delhi Public School, RK Puram 
2008: Pune Winners—Vikhe Patil School 
2008: Kolkata Winners—Don Bosco Kolkata 
2008: Chennai Winners—Padma Sheshadri Bal Bhavan, Chennai

2008: National Winners—Padma Sheshadri Bal Bhavan, Chennai

2009: Kolkata Winners—Birla High School 
2009: New Delhi Winners—Delhi Public School, Ghaziabad 
2009: Chennai Winners—PSBB Sr Secondary School, Nungambakkam 
2009: Pune Winners—Abhinava Vidyalaya English Medium High School 
2009: Bangalore Winners—Sri Kumaran Public School (ICSE)

2009: National Winners—Sri Kumaran Public School (ICSE) - Bangalore 

2010: National Winners—Sri Kumaran Public School (ICSE) - Bangalore 

2011: Kolkata Winners—Nalanda Talent School, VIZAG 
2011: New Delhi Winners—Amity International School, SAKET 
2011: Chennai Winners—Sri Sankara Sr Sec School, Adyar 
2011: Mumbai Winners—St. Augustine's High School 
2011: Bangalore Winners—Sri Vidya Mandir High School

2011: National Winners—Nalanda Talent School, VIZAG  

2013: Kolkata Winners—Don Bosco 
2013: New Delhi Winners—Amity International School, SAKET 
2013: Chennai Winners—P S Senior Secondary School 
2013: Mumbai Winners—St. Augustine's High School 
2013: Bangalore Winners—Sri Kumaran Children's Home(CBSE)

2013: National Winners—Sri Kumaran Children's Home(CBSE)

MahaQuizzer 
Mahaquizzer was begun in 2005 as an attempt to popularise KQA-style quizzing in other parts of the country. The quiz is a solo championship requiring contestants to try out 150 questions over 90 minutes on the same day at different venues across the country. The first edition of the quiz was held in Bangalore, Chennai, Hyderabad, Thiruvananthapuram and Mumbai. In 2019, the contest was held in over 20 cities. A version for school students, titled Junior Mahaquizzer, was started in 2019.

Winners are declared for each city and the overall winner is awarded the MahaQuizzer title for that year. Since 2006, the Wing Commander G.R. Mulky Memorial Trophy for Quizzing Excellence has been awarded to the overall winner each year.

MahaQuizzer winners 
2005: Anustup Datta
2006: Swaminathan G.
2007: Samanth Subramanian
2008: Arul Mani
2009: Anustup Datta
2010: Shouvik Guha
2011: Arul Mani
2012: Jayashree Mohanka
2013: Anustup Datta
2013*: Vikram Joshi
2014: Vinoo Sanjay
2015: Vinoo Sanjay
2016: Samanth Subramanian
2017: Rahul Kottalgi, Vinoo Sanjay
2018: Thejaswi Udupa 
 A one-off KQA 30th Anniversary Special edition of Mahaquizzer was held

Go Ogle 
KQA also holds an online solo quiz championship titled Go Ogle on New Year's Day. The quiz attracts participants from a small band of diehard quizzers across the world.

Go Ogle winners 
2006: Anustup Datta, Bangalore
2007: Siddhartha Sen, Bangalore
2008: Kiran Vijayakumar, Chennai
2009: Jayakanthan, Chennai
2010: Arun Hiregange, Bangalore
2011: Thejaswi Udupa, Bangalore

Mega-Whats 
Mega-Whats is the National Open Quizzing Championship, begun in 2009. It is a general quiz open to teams that may consist of a maximum of 4 members. The contest is held simultaneously in several Indian cities on the second Sunday in May. The top 16 teams, including the top 8 city winners, compete against each other in the Mega-Whats Face-off the following June during the KQA Anniversary. Until 2012, the quiz was held on the second Sunday of December, and since then has shifted to the second Sunday in May.

List of winners of Mega-Whats 
2009: QED, Chennai, 67 (QED, Chennai) 
2010: QED, Chennai, 76 (Insignificant Others, Chennai) 
2011: QED, Chennai, 85 (QED, Chennai)  
2012: MetaQuizziks, Bengaluru, 79 (QED, Chennai) 
2014: MetaQuizziks, Bengaluru, 86 (QED, Chennai) 
2015:  QED, Chennai, 86 (QED, Chennai) 
2016:  We Are Like This (W)Only, Bengaluru, 72 (Remembrance of Things Fast, Chennai) 
2017:  QED, Chennai, 84 (We Are Like This (W)Only, Bengaluru) 
2018:  Aardvarks, New Delhi, 83 (We Are Like This (W)Only, Bengaluru) 
2019:  Remembrance of Things Fast, Bengaluru, 70 (QED, Chennai) 

(Mega-Whats Face-off winners in brackets)

See also 
 Quizzing in India
 Mahaquizzer

References

External links 

 Article by Harshini Vakkalanka in The Hindu, 2011
 Article by Sevanti Ninan in The Hindu, 2003

Student quiz competitions
Organisations based in Bangalore
Competitions in India
1983 establishments in Karnataka
Organizations established in 1983